Meckelia philadelphica is a species of ulidiid or picture-winged fly in the genus Meckelia of the family Tephritidae.

References

Ulidiidae